The Civil Partnership Act 2004 (c 33) is an Act of the Parliament of the United Kingdom, introduced by the Labour government, which grants civil partnerships in the United Kingdom the rights and responsibilities very similar to those in civil marriage. Initially the Act permitted only same-sex couples to form civil partnerships. This was altered to include opposite-sex couples in 2019. Civil partners are entitled to the same property rights as married couples, the same exemption as married couples regarding social security and pension benefits, and also the ability to exercise parental responsibility for a partner's children, as well as responsibility for reasonable maintenance of one's partner and their children, tenancy rights, full life insurance recognition, next-of-kin rights in hospitals, and others. There is a formal process for dissolving civil partnerships, akin to divorce.

Schedule 20 
Schedule 20 recognises certain overseas unions as equivalent to civil partnerships under the laws of the United Kingdom. Same-sex couples who have entered into those unions are automatically recognised in the United Kingdom as civil partners. In England and Wales, overseas marriages (but not other types of relationship) are automatically recognised as marriages by the Marriage (Same Sex Couples) Act 2013; the same is true in Scotland by the Marriage and Civil Partnership (Scotland) Act 2014, and in Northern Ireland by The Marriage (Same-sex Couples) and Civil Partnership (Opposite-sex Couples) (Northern Ireland) Regulations 2019.

Schedule 20 is subject to adjustment, and additional overseas relationships may be added as more jurisdictions across the world bring in civil partnership or same-sex marriage legislation. On 5 December 2005, the original schedule of the 2004 act was amended to include several other countries and states. On 31 January 2013, a further 50 types of overseas relationship were added to the schedule. Relationships not specified in the schedule may also recognised as civil partnerships if they meet the conditions of Section 214 of the Act, therefore many of the unions listed below as not listed in Schedule 20 may nonetheless be recognised.

Overseas relationships recognised under Schedule 20, as amended 
 Andorra: unió estable de parella (stable couple union)
 Argentina: marriage
 Buenos Aires: unión civil (civil union)
 Australia
 Australian Capital Territory: civil partnership
 New South Wales: registered partnership
 Queensland: registered relationship
 Tasmania: significant relationship
 Victoria: registered partnership
 Austria: eingetragene Partnerschaft (registered partnership)
 Belgium: marriage, cohabitation légale/wettelijke samenwoning/gesetzliches Zusammenwohnen (statutory cohabitation)
 Brazil: marriage, união estável (stable union)
 Canada: marriage
 Manitoba: common-law relationship
 Nova Scotia: domestic partnership
 Quebec union civile/civil union
 Colombia: unión de hecho (de facto union)
 Czech Republic: registrované partnertsví (registered partnership)
 Denmark: marriage, registreret partnerskab (registered partnership)
 Ecuador: unión civil (civil union)
 Finland: rekisteröity parisuhde/registrerad partnerskap (registered partnership)
 France: pacte civil de solidarité (civil solidarity pact)
 Germany: Lebenspartnerschaft (life partnership)
 Greenland: nalunaarsukkamik inooqatigiinneq/registreret partnerskab (registered partnership)
 Gibraltar: civil partnership
 Hungary: bejegyzett élettársi kapcsolat (registered partnership)
 Iceland: marriage, staðfesta samvist (confirmed cohabitation)
 Ireland: civil partnership
 Isle of Man: civil partnership
 Jersey: civil partnership
 Liechtenstein: eingetragene Partnerschaft (registered partnership)
 Luxembourg: partenariat enregistré/eingetragene Partnerschaft (registered partnership)
 Mexico
 Coahuila: pacto civil de solidaridad (civil solidarity pact)
 Mexico City: marriage, sociedad de convivencia
 Netherlands: marriage, geregistreerd partnerschap (registered partnership)
 New Zealand: civil union
 Norway: marriage, registrert partnerskap (registered partnership)
 Portugal: marriage
 Slovenia: istospolne partnerske skupnosti (registered partnership)
 South Africa: marriage, civil partnership
 Spain: marriage
 Sweden: marriage, registrerat partnerskap (registered partnership)
 Switzerland: eingetragene Partnerschaft/partnenariat enregistré/unione domestica registrata (registered partnership/registered domestic union)
 United States:
 California: marriage, domestic partnership
 Colorado: designated beneficiary relationship
 Connecticut: marriage, civil union
 Delaware: civil union
 District of Columbia: marriage
 Hawaii: civil union, reciprocal beneficiary relationship
 Illinois: civil union
 Iowa: marriage
 Maine: domestic partnership
 Massachusetts: marriage
 Nevada: domestic partnership
 New Hampshire: marriage
 New Jersey: civil union, domestic partnership
 New York: marriage
 Oregon: domestic partnership
 Rhode Island: civil union
 Vermont: marriage, civil union
 Washington: domestic partnership
 Wisconsin: domestic partnership
 Uruguay: unión concubinaria (cohabitation union)

Notes

Unions adopted since Schedule 20 last amended 
The following unions were created after Schedule 20 was last updated:
 France: marriage
 Ireland: marriage
 New Zealand: marriage
 United States: marriage (federal)
 Uruguay: marriage
 Isle of Man: marriage
 Pitcairn Islands: marriage

Legislative passage 
The Act was announced in the Queen's Speech at the start of the 2003/2004 legislative session, and its full text was revealed on 31 March 2004. It received Royal Assent on 18 November 2004 and came into force on 5 December 2005, allowing the first couples to form civil partnerships 15 days later. Confusion regarding the interpretation of the Act led to registrations being accepted from 19 December in Northern Ireland, 20 December in Scotland and 21 December in England and Wales. The Scottish Parliament voted in favour of a Legislative Consent Motion allowing Westminster to legislate for Scotland in this Act.

Political opposition and support 
The Bill was backed by the Labour Party, the Liberal Democrats, Plaid Cymru, the SNP and the SDLP. It was opposed by the DUP and the UUP. Conservative Party MPs were split on the issue, and the party leadership did not issue a whip mandating MPs to take a particular stance on the Bill, instead allowing its MPs a free vote. This decision was described by some in the British media as an attempt to demonstrate a shift to a more inclusive, centrist approach under the leadership of Michael Howard, and as a departure from the alleged active opposition to LGBT rights under the leadership of Iain Duncan Smith. As party leader, Duncan Smith had imposed a three-line whip against the Adoption and Children Bill, mandating all Conservative MPs to vote against extending adoption rights to same-sex couples. Conservative MPs split 67 in favour to 37 against at the second reading, and 43 in favour to 39 against at the third reading. High-profile Conservative MPs who voted against the Civil Partnerships Bill included Iain Duncan Smith, Ann Widdecombe, Bob Spink and Peter Lilley. Those who voted in favour included David Cameron, George Osborne and party leader Michael Howard. Around 30 Conservative MPs did not participate in any of the votes.

Amendments 
An amendment tabled by Conservative MP Edward Leigh proposed to extend the property and pension rights afforded by civil partnerships to siblings who had lived together for more than 12 years. This was opposed by many backers of the bill, such as frontbench Conservative MP Alan Duncan, who considered it a wrecking amendment. Leigh himself was an opponent of the Civil Partnerships bill, and voted against it at the second reading. The amendment was backed by Norman Tebbit and the Christian Institute, which paid for a full page advert in favour of the amendment in The Times newspaper. Labour and the Liberal Democrats issued a whip against the Leigh Amendment, and only two MPs from each party rebelled to vote in favour of it.

On 24 June 2004, during the discussion at the report stage in the House of Lords, Conservative peer Baroness O'Cathain moved an amendment to extend eligibility for civil partnership to blood relatives who had lived together for a minimum period of time. This amendment was passed in the Lords by 148 to 130, a majority of 18. Like the Leigh amendment, opponents considered the O'Cathain amendment to be a wrecking amendment, and like Leigh, O'Cathain herself voted against the Civil Partnerships Bill. Labour Peer Baron Alli, said the amendment was "ill-conceived and does nothing other than undermine the purpose of the bill", while the gay rights group Stonewall said the amendment was "unworkable and undermined hundreds of years of family law".

The House of Commons later removed this amendment and sent the revised Bill back to the Lords for reconsideration. The Lords decided to accept the Commons version on 17 November and the Bill received Royal Assent the next day.

Legal process to form a civil partnership in the UK 
To form a civil partnership in the UK, both parties must be over the age of 16, not already in a civil partnership or marriage, and not be within the prohibited degrees of relationship. If of the age of 16 or 17, the consent of the individual's parent or guardian is required, except in Scotland, where marriages and civil partnerships can take place from the age of 16 with no need for parental consent.

From 2004 to 2019 both parties to a partnership also had to be of the same sex. This requirement was removed by Parliament in March 2019, and since 2 December 2019 couples irrespective of sex can register their intent to form a civil partnership.

To complete the registration process, the couple must each give notice of their intention to the registry office. After 15 days they can complete the registration process. The couple can also have a ceremony if they choose but this is not a requirement of the Act. The first date on which notice could be given was 5 December 2005 and the first registration was on 21 December 2005. The 15-day notice period allows the registrar to check that the couple is eligible to go ahead with the registration.

Expansion of civil partnerships to opposite-sex couples
In June 2018, the Supreme Court ruled in the Steinfeld–Keidan case that restricting civil partnerships to same-sex couples was discriminatory and mandated that the Government change the law, although did not set a timeline for doing so. In response, the Prime Minister announced in October 2018 that civil partnerships would be opened to heterosexual couples. Legislation that requires the Secretary of State to issue regulations amending the Civil Partnership Act, so that opposite-sex couples may enter into civil partnerships, passed the Parliament on 15 March and received royal assent on 26 March 2019. The legislation was enacted on 26 May 2019 in the form of the Civil Partnerships, Marriages and Deaths (Registration etc) Act 2019. The regulations came into effect on 2 December 2019, the date on which opposite-sex couples could register their intent to form a civil partnership. This expansion of civil partnerships to opposite-sex couples applies only in England and Wales, and not in Scotland or Northern Ireland. In Northern Ireland, civil partnerships were extended to opposite-sex couples by The Marriage (Same-sex Couples) and Civil Partnership (Opposite-sex Couples) (Northern Ireland) Regulations 2019.

See also 

 LGBT rights in the United Kingdom
 Marriage (Same Sex Couples) Act 2013
 Marriage and Civil Partnership (Scotland) Act 2014

References

Further reading

External links 
 Equalities Office information on civil partnerships

Drafts of the Act 
 Civil Partnership Bill official text from 26 October 2004
 Civil Partnership Bill official text from 5 July 2004
 Civil Partnership Bill official text from 30 March 2004

United Kingdom Acts of Parliament 2004
LGBT history in the United Kingdom
LGBT law in the United Kingdom
2004 in LGBT history
Same-sex union legislation
Marriage, unions and partnerships in the United Kingdom